Town of Pines is a town in Pine Township, Porter County, in the U.S. state of Indiana. The population was 708 at the 2010 census.

Geography
Town of Pines is located near Lake Michigan and adjacent to the Indiana Dunes National Park. It is located at  (41.688486, -86.946297).

Demographics

2010 census
As of the census of 2010, there were 708 people, 302 households, and 184 families living in the town. The racial makeup of the town was 93.9% White, 2.3% African American, 0.4% Native American, 0.3% Asian, 0.1% from other races, and 3.0% from two or more races. Hispanic or Latino of any race were 3.1% of the population.

There were 302 households, of which 21.9% had children under the age of 18 living with them, 46.0% were married couples living together, 10.6% had a female householder with no husband present, 4.3% had a male householder with no wife present, and 39.1% were non-families. 31.1% of all households were made up of individuals, and 9.9% had someone living alone who was 65 years of age or older. The average household size was 2.34 and the average family size was 2.94.

The median age in the town was 45.3 years. 18.8% of residents were under the age of 18; 6.6% were between the ages of 18 and 24; 24.2% were from 25 to 44; 36% were from 45 to 64; and 14.5% were 65 years of age or older. The gender makeup of the town was 50.4% male and 49.6% female.

2000 census
As of the census of 2000, there were 798 people, 332 households, and 226 families living in the town. The racial makeup of the town was 96.24% White, 0.13% African American, 1.38% Native American, 0.50% Asian, 0.13% from other races, and 1.63% from two or more races. Hispanic or Latino of any race were 2.13% of the population.

There were 332 households, out of which 27.1% had children under the age of 18 living with them, 56.0% were married couples living together, 7.8% had a female householder with no husband present, and 31.9% were non-families. 26.8% of all households were made up of individuals, and 6.9% had someone living alone who was 65 years of age or older. The average household size was 2.40 and the average family size was 2.92.

In the town, the population was spread out, with 20.7% under the age of 18, 8.6% from 18 to 24, 30.1% from 25 to 44, 29.6% from 45 to 64, and 11.0% who were 65 years of age or older. The median age was 40 years. For every 100 females, there were 108.9 males. For every 100 females age 18 and over, there were 110.3 males.

The median income for a household in the town was $41,875, and the median income for a family was $47,143. Males had a median income of $41,000 versus $22,969 for females. The per capita income for the town was $19,856. About 4.6% of families and 8.7% of the population were below the poverty line, including 11.8% of those under age 18 and 14.9% of those age 65 or over.

Transportation

Town of Pines is the home of Indiana State Road 520, a 0.2-mile-long (0.3 km) state highway connecting U.S. Highway 12 to U.S. Highway 20.  It is the shortest state highway in Indiana.

The Central Avenue station of the South Shore Line, also known as Pines station, served Town of Pines from 1927 until its demolition in the 1970s.

References

External links 
 

Towns in Porter County, Indiana
Towns in Indiana